Marinov (Russian: Маринов) is a Bulgarian and Russian masculine surname, its feminine counterpart is Marinova (Мари́нова).  It may refer to:

Amnon Marinov (1930–2011), Israeli physicist
Dimiter Marinov (born 1964), Bulgarian-American actor
Ivailo Marinov (born 1960), Bulgarian boxer of Turkish ancestry
Ivan Marinov (canoeist) (born 1968), Bulgarian sprint canoer
Ivan Marinov (composer) (1928–2003), Bulgarian composer
Martin Marinov (born 1967), Bulgarian-born Australian flatwater canoer
Nikola Marinov (1879–1948), Bulgarian painter and teacher
Sevdalin Marinov (born 1968), Bulgarian weightlifter
Stefan Marinov (1931–1997), Bulgarian physicist
Ventsislav Marinov (born 1983), Bulgarian footballer
Veselin Marinov (born 1961), Bulgarian singer
Galina Marinova (artistic gymnast) (born 1964), Bulgarian Olympic artistic gymnast
Galina Marinova (rhythmic gymnast) (born 1985), Bulgarian Olympic rhythmic gymnast
Katerina Marinova (born 1999), Bulgarian rhythmic gymnast
Margarita Marinova, Bulgarian aeronautical engineer
Mihaela Marinova (born 1998), Bulgarian singer and songwriter 
Mila Marinova (born 1974), Bulgarian rhythmic gymnast
Neli Marinova (born 1971), Bulgarian volleyball player
Simona Marinova (born 1994), Macedonian swimmer
Sofi Marinova (born 1975), Bulgarian pop-folk and ethno-pop singer
Tereza Marinova (born 1977), Bulgarian long jumper and triple jumper
Vanya Marinova (born 1950), Bulgarian Olympic artistic gymnast
Victoria Marinova (1988–2018), Bulgarian journalist
Yana Marinova (born 1978), Bulgarian actress
Yuliana Marinova (born 1967), Bulgarian sprinter 
Zornitsa Marinova (born 1987), Bulgarian rhythmic gymnast

Bulgarian-language surnames